Beckermet Mines railway station was situated at Pit No.1 of the mine of the same name.

The mine was opened in 1903 in open country west of the hamlet of Haile, Cumbria, England. The site's surroundings remained rural in 2013.

History and location
The line off which the branch was built was one of the fruits of the rapid industrialisation of West Cumberland in the second half of the nineteenth century. Tracks were laid southwards from Whitehaven and Moor Row as far as Egremont by the Whitehaven, Cleator and Egremont Railway, opening to passengers on 1 July 1857. The Furness opposed this, but the two companies came to an accommodation and built the Egremont to Sellafield extension as a joint line.

When winnable ore was found north east of Beckermet some years later the railway was well placed to serve it, with a workmen's service being a natural consequence in the days long before mass car ownership and road public transport. Beckermet Mine and its workmen's halt were Twentieth Century additions to the line.

The station was very likely to have been an unstaffed halt, no platform is identified as such on contemporary OS maps. The mine's products continued to be taken away by rail until the 1970s.

Rundown and closure
An online source gives the mine's closure date as 1973, whilst three books give it as 1980. Both sides could be right, as Florence, Ullcoats and Beckermet mines were joined underground in their later years. The mine's product was the last traffic on any of the lines built by the Whitehaven, Cleator and Egremont Railway. The "main line" off which the branch was built closed when Beckermet Mine closed, all the way back to Corkickle. It lay unused until 1993, when it was lifted.

The exact date the workmen's service ended is not yet confirmed.

Afterlife
By 2013 the site of the mine was occupied by the Beckermet Industrial Estate with road access only.

See also

 Furness Railway
 Cleator and Workington Junction Railway
 Whitehaven, Cleator and Egremont Railway
 British quarrying and mining narrow gauge railways

References

Sources

Further reading

External links
The mine and implied station on overlain OS maps surveyed from 1937 National Library of Scotland
The mine and implied station on overlain OS maps surveyed from 1923 National Library of Scotland
The mine and implied station on a 1948 OS Map npe maps
Map of the line with photos RAILSCOT
The line off which the branch diverges with Engineer's Line References railwaycodes.org.uk
Haematite earthminerals
Beckermet Mines mindat
The mine Durham Mining Museum
Beckermet mine from the air between the wars Britain from above
The Business Park The Parish Council
Two shots of a Class 25 diesel shunting at the mine flickr

Disused railway stations in Cumbria
Railway stations in Great Britain opened in 1912
Railway stations in Great Britain closed in 1923
1912 establishments in England
1923 disestablishments in England